Bahij al-Khatib (1895–1981) was a French-appointed Syrian Head of State from July 10, 1939 to April 4, 1941. He was the father of Ahmad al-Khatib (1932-1982).

Early life
Al-Khatib was born in 1895 in Shheem, Chouf District, Ottoman Empire (modern-day Lebanon). He was educated at the Syria Protestant College and was an oil merchant in Beirut before entering politics.

Career
Al-Khatib was staunchly loyal to the continued French administration of Syria and opposed all aspirations for independence. He began his political career when he joined the civil service in Damascus after France imposed its League of Nations mandate over Syria and Lebanon in July 1920. Due to his loyalty to the French administration, he rose to be Director of Police and Public Security, and lead a campaign of intimidation and harassment of nationalist leaders and organizations. When the Nationalist Hashim al-Atassi, the first president of the newly declared Syrian Republic, resigned in protest over continued French prevarication against full independence, al-Khatib was appointed in his stead by the French authorities.
 

Due to his extreme unpopularity, he was eventually asked to resign by French president Charles de Gaulle in 1941. 

Later on, Al-Khatib served as the Minister of Interior twice, and as the Governor of Damascus in 1943. He left Syria back to Lebanon after the Ba'ath Party took power in Syria. He died in 1981.

References

Presidents of Syria
1895 births
1981 deaths
20th-century Syrian politicians
Syrian Freemasons